Farshad Bashir (born 14 January 1988 in Kabul) is a Dutch politician of Afghan descent. As a member of the Socialist Party (Socialistische Partij) he was an MP from 15 January 2008 to 23 March 2017. He focused on matters of taxation, traffic and water management.

Biography 
His father was a journalist in the daily Anis during the communist régime. After the take-over of the major part of Afghanistan by the Taliban in 1996, he fled with his family to Tajikistan and thereafter to the Netherlands in 1997, where they were granted asylum. He went to live in Mantgum, which is a village in the province of Friesland.

On 10 July 2002, he became a member of the Socialist Party and of its youth organisation ROOD. On 16 March 2006 he was elected into the municipal council of Leeuwarden. He was a councillor until 28 January 2008. In the same month he became a member of the Dutch House of Representatives, succeeding Rosita van Gijlswijk, thus becoming the youngest Dutch MP ever.

His term in the House ended on 23 March 2017.

Bashir stated that he would refuse to swear an oath of loyalty to the soon-to-be-crowned Prince of Orange, Willem Alexander. Bashir is a republican and is against the Dutch monarchy.

Bashir studied mathematics and physics at the University of Groningen (BSc) and tax law at Leiden University.

References

External links 

  
  House of Representatives biography
  Parlement.com biography

1988 births
Living people
Afghan emigrants to the Netherlands
Dutch republicans
Members of the House of Representatives (Netherlands)
Municipal councillors of Leeuwarden
People from Kabul
People from Littenseradiel
Socialist Party (Netherlands) politicians
University of Groningen alumni
21st-century Dutch politicians